Edward McCarthy was the sixth Chief of Police of the Los Angeles Police Department and had one of the shortest commands of any chief, being forced out of office on May 12, 1885, after serving only since January 2 of that year.

During his short period in office, McCarthy commanded 15 officers in a department that had $354 worth of equipment and was paid $150 a month.

See also
 List of Los Angeles Police Department Chiefs of Police

References

Chiefs of the Los Angeles Police Department
Year of birth missing
Year of death missing
19th-century American people